"Brokeback Mountain" is a short story by American author Annie Proulx.  It was originally published in The New Yorker on October 13, 1997, for which it won the National Magazine Award for Fiction in 1998. Proulx won a third place O. Henry Award for the story in 1998. A slightly expanded version of the story was published in Proulx's 1999 collection of short stories, Close Range: Wyoming Stories.  The collection was a finalist for the 2000 Pulitzer Prize for Fiction.

Screenwriters Larry McMurtry and Diana Ossana adapted the story for the 2005 film. At that time, the short story and the screenplay were published together, along with essays by Proulx and the screenwriters, as Brokeback Mountain: Story to Screenplay. The story was also published separately in book form.

This story has also been adapted as an opera by the same name, composed by Charles Wuorinen with a libretto in English by Proulx. It premiered at the Teatro Real in Madrid on January 28, 2014.

Synopsis
In 1963, two young men, Ennis del Mar and Jack Twist, are hired for the summer to look after sheep at a seasonal grazing range on the fictional Brokeback Mountain in Wyoming. Unexpectedly, they form an intense emotional and sexual attachment, but have to part ways at the end of the summer. Over the next twenty years, as their separate lives play out with marriages, children, and jobs, they continue reuniting for brief liaisons on camping trips in remote settings.

Literary form
"Brokeback Mountain" is a story told by an omniscient narrator. The narrative is realistic in tone and employs description, metaphor and dialogue to examine the actions, thoughts, emotions, and motivations of its main characters.

The narrative is mostly linear, apart from an introductory prologue (which was accidentally omitted from the initial publication in The New Yorker magazine); the story describes events in sequence from a beginning point in time, the year 1963 when the characters are introduced, to the end of the story some 20 years later. Other than the title location and the town of Signal which is the nearest settlement to the eponymous mountain, the settings are actual locations in the United States. The characters are described in a naturalistic manner, as people living in a specific milieu. The story adheres to conventions of modern dramatic fiction; its literary devices serve to present a portrait of recognizable people in familiar situations, without supernatural or metaphysical allusions (while other of the Wyoming Stories do include passages of magical realism).

In the two-paragraph prologue, the lead protagonist, Ennis del Mar, awakes in his trailer at some unspecified time beyond the ending of the story. He has had a dream about Jack Twist, and over a cup of coffee he reflects on the time in 1963 when he first met Jack. The main narrative then begins with the description of the two protagonists as they were in 1963:

From there, the story is an episodic examination of conflicts arising from the characters' interaction with each other and other people in their lives. The story condenses passing years and significant events into brief passages, and employs dialogue to reveal character and conflict.

Origins
Proulx said she wrote the story based on her own reflections about life in the West. Regarding the setting, Proulx stated:

She mentioned once noticing a middle-aged man in a bar, who appeared to be watching only the men playing pool, which led her to consider the life of a typical western ranch hand who might be gay.

She wrote the story over a period of about six months, and went through more than sixty drafts. Working titles for the story included, "The Pleasures of Whiskey Mountain," "Bulldust Mountain," "Swill-Swallow Mountain," and "Drinkard Mountain". Proulx said her main characters of the two men affected her long after the story was published. The film version rekindled her feelings for them — an attachment that she had previously rejected. In a 1999 interview in The Missouri Review, Proulx dispelled the rumor that she had fallen in love with her own fictional characters, claiming that notion was "repugnant," and that their central duty is to carry a story.

Adaptations

Film

The film Brokeback Mountain (2005) won numerous awards, including Academy Awards (for 2005) for Best Adapted Screenplay (McMurtry and Ossana), Best Director (Ang Lee), and Best Original Score (Gustavo Santaolalla). It was nominated for a total of eight awards (the most that year), including Best Picture, Best Actor (Heath Ledger as Ennis), Best Supporting Actor (Jake Gyllenhaal as Jack), and Best Supporting Actress (Michelle Williams as Ennis' wife Alma). Its loss of Best Picture to Crash was not generally expected, though predicted by some.

Opera

Charles Wuorinen, a contemporary American composer, became interested in the story, and Proulx wrote the libretto to adapt her work. Their work was commissioned by Mortier of the New York City Opera and they started working together in 2008, completing it in 2012. The work premiered at the Teatro Real in Madrid on January 28, 2014.

Play
A play adaptation, written by Ashley Robinson with music by Dan Gillespie Sells, starring Mike Faist as Jack and Lucas Hedges as Ennis will debut on London's West End in May 2023.

Fan fiction
The film's popularity has inspired numerous viewers to write their own versions of the story and send these to Proulx. In 2008, Proulx said she wished she had never written the 1997 short story which inspired the film, because she has received so much fan fiction presenting alternative plots:	

	 	
She said the authors, mostly men who claim to "understand men better than I do", often send her their works:

See also

List of accolades received by Brokeback Mountain

References

Further reading
Brokeback Mountain in The New Yorker
Proulx, Annie (1997, 1999, 2006). Close Range: Brokeback Mountain and Other Stories. London, New York, Toronto and Sydney: Harper Perennial. ; 
Brokeback Mountain: Story to Screenplay (includes the short story and film screenplay), New York: Scribner, 2005. ; 

Short Story
1990s LGBT literature
1997 short stories
American short stories
Bisexuality-related fiction
LGBT literature in the United States
Works by Annie Proulx
Works originally published in The New Yorker
Short stories adapted into films
Wyoming in fiction
LGBT short stories